Kauehi Aerodrome  is an airport on Kauehi, part of the Tuamotu in French Polynesia.

Airlines and destinations

References 

Airports in French Polynesia